Oleksandr Klymenko (variations  and ) is a popular name for people with a family name of Klymenko. It can also be spelled through the Russian transcription as Aleksandr Klimenko and may refer to following people:
 Aleksandr Klimenko (shot putter) (1970–2000), Ukrainian shot putter
 Oleksandr Klymenko (cyclist), Ukrainian cyclist
 Oleksandr Klymenko (detective), head of Ukrainian Specialized Anti-Corruption Prosecutor's Office since 28 July 2022
 Oleksandr Klymenko (footballer) (born 1982), Ukrainian footballer
 Oleksandr Klymenko (politician), Ukrainian politician
 Oleksandr Klymenko (2014 Ukrainian presidential candidate), Ukrainian politician